Dean Andrews (born 6 August 1963) is an English actor. He is known for his role as DS Ray Carling in the BBC drama series Life on Mars. He continued the role in the sequel series, Ashes to Ashes, until 2010. As of April 2019, he has appeared as Will Taylor on ITV soap opera Emmerdale.

Early life
Born in 1963 in Rotherham, Andrews went to Sitwell Junior School on Grange Road and Oakwood Comprehensive School on Moorgate Road. He went to school with Top Gear presenter James May.

Career
Dean Andrews started off as a mainstay of cruise ships as a talented entertainer and singer. He then went onto playing Barry Shiel in the Channel 4 drama Buried, which won the BAFTA Award for Best Drama Series in 2004.
In 2005, Andrews played the character of Steven Maynard in the ITV drama Wire in the Blood. In 2006, he appeared in another BBC drama, Life On Mars, as the character DS Ray Carling. In 2007, he appeared in the BBC dramas True Dare Kiss and The Street. In 2008, he returned to play the character in the spin-off series Ashes to Ashes.
Andrews also had a small role in the Channel 4 series No Angels playing Neil. He also appeared in an episode of BBC drama Waterloo Road.  Andrews also played one of the lead roles in ITV's supernatural drama series Marchlands.

In 2011, he appeared in the BBC Two television film United, in which tells the story of the Manchester United "Busby Babes" team and the 1958 Munich air disaster. In September 2011, he appeared in the BBC drama The Body Farm as Peter Collins. In November 2012, he appeared in the six-part BBC drama Last Tango in Halifax as Robert "Robbie" Greenwood. He also played the lead role in the five part BBC One series The Case, about a man accused of murdering his terminally ill girlfriend. He has also recorded voiceovers for Currys television advertisements. In February 2013, Andrews portrayed the role of Pete Lewis in the BBC show Being Eileen.

In 2015, Andrews appeared as Tom Asher in ITV's Midsomer Murders episode 17.3 "The Ballad of Midsomer County".

In 2019, Andrews joined the cast of ITV soap opera Emmerdale.

Filmography

Awards and nominations

References

External links
 

Living people
English male television actors
English male film actors
1963 births
Actors from Rotherham
Male actors from Yorkshire